This article shows all participating team squads at the 2007 Women's European Volleyball Championship, held in Luxembourg and Belgium from September 20 to September 30, 2007.

Pool A

Head Coach: Faig Garayg

Head Coach: Vladimir Koslov

Head Coach: Giovanni Guidetti

Head Coach: Massimo Barbolini

Pool B

Head Coach: Dragan Nešić

Head Coach: Tana Krempaska

Head Coach: Marco Bonitta

Head Coach: Aurenlio Urena

Pool C

Head Coach: Mijo Vuković

Head Coach: Yan Fang

Head Coach: Giovanni Caprara

Head Coach: Alessandro Chiappini

Pool D

Head Coach: Jan Debrandt

Head Coach: Avital Selinger

Head Coach: Zoran Terzić

Head Coach: Miroslav Čada

References
CEV website

E
Women's European Volleyball Championships
2007 in Belgian women's sport
2007 in Luxembourgian women's sport
International volleyball competitions hosted by Belgium
International volleyball competitions hosted by Luxembourg
European Volleyball Championships